Sterculic acid is a cyclopropene fatty acid. It is found in various plants of the genus Sterculia, including being the main component of Sterculia foetida seed oil.

Biosynthesis
The biosynthesis of sterculic acid begins with the cyclopropanation of the alkene of phospholipid-bound oleic acid, an 18-carbon cis-monounsaturated fatty acid. This transformation involves two mechanistic steps: electrophilic methylation with S-adenosyl methionine to give a carbocationic reactive intermediate, followed by cyclization via loss of H+ mediated by a cyclopropane-fatty-acyl-phospholipid synthase enzyme. The product, dihydrosterculic acid, is converted to sterculic acid by dehydrogenation of the cis-disubstituted cyclopropane to cyclopropene. An additional step of α oxidation removes one carbon from the carboxy chain to form the 17-carbon-chain structure of malvalic acid.

References 

Fatty acids
Cyclopropenes